The 2017 ADAC Formula 4 Championship was the third season of the ADAC Formula 4. It began on 29 April at Oschersleben and finished on 24 September at Hockenheim after seven triple header rounds.

Teams and drivers
In December 2016, ten teams and twenty eight cars were confirmed for the 2017 season:

Race calendar and results
All rounds, except the second Oschersleben round were part of ADAC GT Masters weekends.

Championship standings

Points were awarded to the top 10 classified finishers in each race. No points were awarded for pole position or fastest lap.

Drivers' Championship
For the second race in Nürburgring, only half points were awarded because of a red flag finish that was less than half of the race distance after Cedric Piro's crash.

Rookies' Championship

Teams' championship

References

External links
 

ADAC Formula 4 seasons
ADAC
ADAC Formula 4
ADAC F4